The Florida Film Critics Circle Award for Best Animated Feature is an award given by the Florida Film Critics Circle to honor the finest achievements in animated filmmaking.

Winners

1990s

2000s

2010s

2020s

References

Florida Film Critics Circle Awards
Lists of films by award
Awards for best animated feature film
Awards established in 1999